There are at least 115 named mountain ranges in Idaho. Some of these ranges extend into the neighboring states of Montana, Nevada, Oregon, Utah, Washington, and Wyoming. Names, elevations and coordinates from the U.S. Geological Survey, Geographic Names Information System.

The List

See also 

 Bitterroot National Forest
 List of mountain ranges in Montana
 List of mountain peaks of Idaho

Notes

Idaho, List of mountain ranges of
Idaho
Lists of landforms of Idaho